New Chalrang is a village in the Khawzawl district of Mizoram, India. It is located in the Khawzawl R.D. Block.

Demographics 

According to the 2011 census of India, New Chalrang has 101 households. The effective literacy rate (i.e. the literacy rate of population excluding children aged 6 and below) is 98.09%.

References 

Villages in Khawzawl block